Vadym Karatayev or Vadim Karataev (born 15 January 1964) is an association footballer from the former Soviet Union.

In 1983, he took part in the Summer Spartakiad of the Peoples of the USSR in the team of Ukrainian SSR. He also participated in the 1983 FIFA World Youth Championship for the Soviet team.

References

External links
 
 
 

1964 births
Living people
People from Alchevsk
Soviet footballers
Ukrainian footballers
Soviet Top League players
FC Dynamo Kyiv players
FC Chornomorets Odesa players
FC Shakhtar Stakhanov players
FC Krystal Kherson players
FC Zimbru Chișinău players
Wisła Płock players
Hapoel Ashkelon F.C. players
Ukrainian expatriate footballers
Expatriate footballers in Israel
Expatriate footballers in Poland
Association football defenders
Neftçi PFK players
Sportspeople from Luhansk Oblast